Gaius Laecanius Bassus Caecina Paetus was a Roman senator of the early Roman Empire, whose known career flourished under the reign of Vespasian. He was suffect consul in the nundinium of November to December AD 70 as the colleague of Lucius Annius Bassus.

His full, polyonymous name is known from a votive inscription from Minturnae set up by a slave named "Theseus". The nomenclature of his name has led scholars to agree that Caecina Paetus was the son of Aulus Caecina Paetus, consul of 37, and that he was adopted by Gaius Laecanius Bassus, consul of 64, between his consulate and his governorship.

Caecina Paetus is attested as consular governor of Roman Asia in 80/81. He also served on the board that managed the water supply of Rome around this time.

He is thought to be the father of Gaius Laecanius Bassus Caecina Flaccus, known from an inscription found at Brundisium. Flaccus died young, aged eighteen.

See also 
Laecania gens

References 

1st-century Romans
Suffect consuls of Imperial Rome
Roman governors of Asia
Senators of the Roman Empire
Laecanius
Ancient Roman adoptees
Laecanii